The Mount Marshall state by-election, 1967 was a by-election held on 2 September 1967 for the Western Australian Legislative Assembly seat of Mount Marshall in the northeastern agricultural part of the state.

The by-election was triggered by the death of Country Party member George Cornell on 30 June 1967.

The seat of Mount Marshall, first established in 1930, was considered to be a safe seat for the Country Party. At the time of the by-election, the seat included the towns of Bencubbin, Dowerin, Kellerberrin, Koorda, Mukinbudin, Trayning and Wyalkatchem, as well as many smaller towns and settlements in the region.

Timeline

Candidates 
The by-election attracted three candidates. Ray McPharlin, representing the Country Party, was a farmer from Dalwallinu who had served on the Dalwallinu shire council from 1958 until 1964. Bill McNee, representing the Liberal and Country League, had farmed at Wyalkatchem and Koorda and was at different times president of both towns' Liberal branches. Djordje Miličić represented the Labor Party.

Results
Ray McPharlin retained the seat for the Country Party. No swings are noted due to the seat being uncontested at the 1965 election.

References 

Mount Marshall state by-election 1967
Western Australian state by-elections
1960s in Western Australia
Mount Marshall state by-election 1967